Keplinger is a surname. Notable people with the surname include:

Dan Keplinger (born 1973), American artist
Gregg Keplinger, American drummer